Mahmood Haji (born 11 March 1991) is a Bahraini sports shooter. He competed in the men's 50 metre rifle prone event at the 2016 Summer Olympics.

References

External links
 

1991 births
Living people
Bahraini male sport shooters
Olympic shooters of Bahrain
Shooters at the 2016 Summer Olympics
Place of birth missing (living people)
Shooters at the 2014 Asian Games
Shooters at the 2018 Asian Games
Asian Games competitors for Bahrain